Rama Pada Jamatia (born 13 February 1957) is an Indian Politician from Tripura. He is currently serving as Minister of Tribal Welfare (excluding TRP & PTG) and Industry & Commerce (Handloom, Handicrafts and Sericulture) in Government of Tripura under Manik Saha Ministry. He became the MLA from Bagma Assembly Constituency by defeating CPI(M) candidate Naresh Jamatia by a margin of 2,833 votes in 2018.

Controversy 

 Tribal Affairs Minister Rampada Jamatia was targeted by demonstrators on Friday afternoon in Simna in the Mohanpur subdivision, a day after his motorcade was ambushed at Jampuijala tri-junction in West Tripura.
 Minister Rampada Jamatia is being criticized once more. The administration of Mohanpur subdivision hosted an administrative camp at Dargamura School in the Simna Assembly Constituency on Friday.
 An indigenous MLA from Tripura, Ram Pada Jamatia, has come out in support of the bill, much to the dismay of the state's tribal leaders, at a time when the indigenous communities of the Northeast are fuming with rage over the union cabinet's decision to clear and table the contentious Citizenship Amendment Bill (CAB), 2019, in the Parliament probably by December 11.

References 

Living people
Tripura MLAs 2018–2023
State cabinet ministers of Tripura
Bharatiya Janata Party
Bharatiya Janata Party politicians from Tripura
Tripura politicians
1957 births
MBB College alumni